Potrero Hills may refer to:
Potrero Hills (Richmond, California), mountains in Contra Costa County, California
Potrero Hills (Solano County, California) are mountains in Solano County, California.

See also
Potrero Hill, a neighborhood of San Francisco, California
Potrero (disambiguation)